The Trophée Lancôme was a professional golf tournament which was staged in Saint-Nom-la-Bretèche, France from 1970 to 2003. 

Gaëtan Mourgue D'Algue, a French golf enthusiast from Saint-Nom-la-Bretèche, hoped to popularize the then little-known sport of Golf in France during the early 1960s. With Dominique Motte, he suggested the creation of a new championship trophy to Pierre Menet, the chairman of the Lancôme Company. Their goal was originally to bring together eight of the best players in the world. Saint-Nom-La-Bretèche had hosted the 1963 Canada Cup and the Open de France in 1965 and 1969.

The tournament started in 1970 as the "Tournament of Champions" but from 1971 it was called the "Trophée Lancôme", named after Menet's company. It began as an unofficial event, in that it was not part of a tour schedule, but it was backed by the Fédération Française de Golf and by preeminent sports agent Mark McCormack who arranged for some of the world's top players to participate. The 1970 and 1971 the tournament was played over three rounds (54 holes), but starting in 1972 it was played over four rounds (72 holes). Originally contested by 8 invited players, the field was increased to 12 in 1979.

From 1982 onwards it was an official money event on the European Tour, with an increased field size. In 1986 Bernhard Langer and Seve Ballesteros were declared joint winners as they were level after four playoff holes when darkness fell.  The tournament ceased operation after 2003.

Winners

Multiple winners
4 wins: Seve Ballesteros (including one shared)
2 wins: Retief Goosen, David Graham, Lee Trevino, Ian Woosnam

Notes

References

External links
Coverage on the European Tour's official site
Official golf site of St. Nom la Breteche

Former European Tour events
Defunct golf tournaments in France
Sport in Yvelines